The 1792 Unzen earthquake and tsunami resulted from the volcanic activities of Mount Unzen (in the Shimabara Peninsula of Nagasaki Prefecture, Japan) on 21 May. This caused the collapse of the southern flank of the Mayuyama dome in front of Mount Unzen, resulting in a tremendous megatsunami, killing 15,000 people altogether.

Volcanic activities
Towards the end of 1791, a series of earthquakes occurred on the western flank of Mount Unzen which gradually moved towards Fugen-dake (one of Mount Unzen's peaks). In February 1792, Fugen-dake started to erupt, triggering a lava flow which continued for two months. Meanwhile, the earthquakes continued, shifting nearer to the city of Shimabara. On the night of 21 May, two large earthquakes were followed by a collapse of the eastern flank of Mount Unzen's Mayuyama dome, causing a landslide which swept through the city of Shimabara and into Ariake Bay, triggering a great tsunami.

Megatsunami
It is not known whether the collapse occurred as a result of an eruption of the dome or as a result of the earthquakes. The tsunami struck Higo Province on the other side of Ariake Bay before bouncing back and hitting Shimabara again. Out of an estimated total of 15,000 fatalities, around 5,000 are thought to have been killed by the landslide, around 5,000 by the tsunami across the bay in Higo Province, and a further 5,000 by the tsunami returning to strike Shimabara. At the Osaki-bana point Futsu town, the waves locally grew to a height of  due to the effect of sea bottom topography.

Monuments
As of July, 1991, the following monuments have been found:

Lake Shirachi

Lake Shirachi is a pond in Shimabara city, Nagasaki Prefecture which was created after the landslide at Mayuyama created by the inpouring of underground water. Its size was first 1 km (south-north) and 300m 400m (east to west), but the production of a water exit river made it smaller and it is now 200 m by 70 m.

Tsukumojima (99 Islets)

As a result of the destruction, Tsukumojima or 99 islets or rocks were distributed near Shimabara city. In the same Nagasaki Prefecture, there are 99 islands or Kujūkushima distributed from Sasebo city to Hirado city. These islands are different from Tsukumojima.

See also

1741 eruption of Oshima–Ōshima and the Kampo tsunami
1771 Great Yaeyama Tsunami
List of earthquakes in Japan
List of historical earthquakes
1888 Ritter Island eruption and tsunami

References

Natural disasters in Nagasaki Prefecture
Natural disasters in Kumamoto Prefecture
Tsunamis in Japan
1792 in Japan 
1792 tsunamis
1792 earthquakes
Megatsunamis
Earthquakes of the Edo period
Volcanic tsunamis
Volcanic earthquakes
Landslides in Japan
1792 disasters in Asia
18th-century disasters in Japan